Harold W. Massingham (25 October 1932 Mexborough—13 March 2011) was an English poet.

Life
He was the son of H. W. Massingham (a collier from Mexborough). He attended the same Mexborough Grammar School as the Yorkshire poet and Poet Laureate Ted Hughes but in a class two years below.
He taught at the University of Manchester; his students included Steven Waling, and Trevor Griffiths.

Harold Massingham lived in Mexborough through his childhood, and then Manchester from his university days, until moving with his wife Pat to Spain in the 1990s. He published three volumes of poetry in 1965, 1972 and 1992.

His work was published in The New Yorker, and Alhambra Poetry Calendar.

Under the pseudonym ‘Mass’ he set crosswords for national newspapers and magazines for more than 30 years. He also compiled chess puzzles.

Awards
 1968 Cholmondeley Awards for Poets

Work

Poetry broadsheets
 Doomsday
 The Magician, Manchester: Phoenix Pamphlet Poets Press, 1969
 Seafarer
 Wanderer
 The Magician's Attic

Poetry books
  
 Frost Gods, Macmillan, 1972
 Sonatas & Dreams, Littlewood Arc, 1992
 Selected Poems, Calder Valley Poetry, 2021

Anthology

References

External links
Harold Massingham Obituary, Yorkshire Post, 19 March 2011
 Paul Britton, Farewell to ‘Mass’: Crossword king Harold Massingham dies, aged 78, Manchester Evening News, 23 March 2011

1932 births
2011 deaths
People from Mexborough
Academics of the University of Manchester
British male poets
20th-century English poets
20th-century English male writers